Dnevni list is a popular daily newspaper in Bosnia and Herzegovina. Its headquarters is in Mostar. The paper is especially popular among the nation of the Croats. The paper has a pro-Croats stance.

References

External links
 

Newspapers published in Bosnia and Herzegovina
Croatian-language newspapers
Mass media in Mostar
Publications with year of establishment missing